Orhei County may refer to:
Orhei County (Moldova)
Orhei County (Romania)